3-Carboxy-cis,cis-muconic acid is a metabolite of the catechin degradation by Bradyrhizobium japonicum.

The enzyme 3-carboxy-cis,cis-muconate cycloisomerase uses 2-carboxy-2,5-dihydro-5-oxofuran-2-acetate to produce 3-carboxy-cis,cis-muconate.

The enzyme carboxy-cis,cis-muconate cyclase uses 3-carboxy-2,5-dihydro-5-oxofuran-2-acetate to produce 3-carboxy-cis,cis-muconate.

The enzyme protocatechuate 3,4-dioxygenase uses 3,4-dihydroxybenzoate and O2 to produce 3-carboxy-cis,cis-muconate.

References

Tricarboxylic acids